Twisting properties in general terms are associated with the properties of samples that identify with statistics that are suitable for exchange.

Description
Starting with a sample  observed from a random variable X having a given distribution law with a  non-set parameter, a parametric inference problem consists of computing suitable values – call them estimates – of this parameter precisely on the basis of the sample. An estimate is suitable if replacing it with the unknown parameter does not cause major damage in next computations. In algorithmic inference, suitability of an estimate reads in terms of compatibility with the observed sample. 

In turn, parameter compatibility is a probability measure that we derive from the probability distribution of the random variable to which the parameter refers. In this way we identify a random parameter Θ compatible with an observed sample.
Given a sampling mechanism , the rationale of this operation lies in using the Z seed distribution law to determine both the X distribution law for the given θ, and the Θ distribution law given an X sample. Hence, we may derive the latter distribution directly from the former if we are able to relate domains of the sample space to subsets of Θ support. In more abstract terms, we speak about twisting properties of samples with properties of parameters and identify the former with statistics that are suitable for this exchange, so denoting a well behavior w.r.t. the unknown parameters. The operational goal is to write the analytic expression of the cumulative distribution function , in light of the observed value s of a statistic S,  as a function of the S distribution law when the X parameter is exactly θ.

Method
Focusing on a relevant statistic  for the parameter θ, the master equation reads

When s is a well-behaved statistic w.r.t the parameter,  we are sure that a monotone relation exists for each  between s and θ.

In the case that s assumes discrete values the first relation changes into  where  is the size of the  s discretization grain, idem with the opposite monotony trend. Resuming these relations on all seeds, for s continuous we have either 

 

or 

 

The whole logical contrivance is called a twisting argument. A  procedure implementing it  is as follows.

Algorithm

Remark
The rationale behind twisting arguments does not change when parameters are vectors, though some complication arises from the management of joint inequalities. Instead, the difficulty of dealing with a vector of parameters proved to be the Achilles heel of Fisher's approach to the fiducial distribution of parameters. Also Fraser’s constructive probabilities devised for the same purpose do not treat this point completely.

Example
For  drawn from a gamma distribution, whose specification requires values for the parameters λ and k, a twisting argument may be stated by following the below procedure. Given the meaning of these parameters we know that 

  

 

This leads to a joint cumulative distribution function

The marginal distribution of K is reported in the picture on the right.

Notes

References

Algorithmic inference
Computational statistics